Trudie Styler (born 6 January 1954) is an English actress and film producer.

Early life and family
Styler was born in Bromsgrove, Worcestershire, the daughter of Pauline and Harry Styler, a farmer and factory worker. When Styler was two years old, she was hit by a van. She received severe facial injuries that left her badly scarred and required several plastic surgery operations up until the age of 18. Her classmates nicknamed her "scarface", which caused her to feel for many years that she was "not a very attractive person". She attended North Bromsgrove High School, where one of her teachers was the singer-songwriter Clifford T. Ward.

Acting career
Styler trained at the Bristol Old Vic Theatre School and went on to appear in various period BBC productions. She joined the Royal Shakespeare Company, in which she played multiple major roles. Her theatre credits also include The Vagina Monologues, Twin Spirits, and The Seagull.

She has appeared in many British television series such as The Mayor of Casterbridge and The Scold's Bridle, and in the United States television shows Empire, The Night Of, Friends (S8 Ep10), and Falling Water.

Film work includes Lifetime Television's Living Proof and Paul Haggis' The Next Three Days. Styler has also made seven mind-body fitness DVDs released by Gaia, Inc.

Film production
In the mid-nineties Styler established Xingu Films, a production company dedicated to supporting new talent, such as Guy Ritchie, Dito Montiel and Duncan Jones. In late July 2008 it was announced that Xingu had optioned American Reaper, an upcoming graphic novel written by Pat Mills, who would also write the screenplay.

Styler has produced and co-directed several award-winning documentaries and feature films, including Guy Ritchie's Lock, Stock, and Two Smoking Barrels and Snatch; Duncan Jones' Moon; and Michael Apted's Moving the Mountain, which won the 1994 International Independent Documentary Award.

After moving to New York, Styler co-founded the production company Maven Pictures with Celine Rattray in 2011. Their first feature, Girl Most Likely, starred Kristen Wiig; closely followed by Filth, starring James McAvoy; Black Nativity starring Forest Whitaker; Ten Thousand Saints starring Ethan Hawke; and American Honey starring Shia LaBeouf, which won Jury Prize (Cannes Film Festival) at the Cannes Film Festival in 2016. Styler's 2017 directorial debut, Freak Show, is based on the New York Times bestseller by James St. James, and stars AnnaSophia Robb, Alex Lawther, and Bette Midler. Freak Show debuted at the 2017 Berlin International Film Festival.

In 2011, she and producer Celine Rattray founded Maven Pictures, a motion picture development, production, and financing company.

Philanthropy
With her husband, Sting, Styler started in 1989 the Rainforest Foundation Fund, an organisation devoted to protecting rainforests and their indigenous peoples, and since 1991 she has produced regular Rock for the Rainforest benefits at Carnegie Hall. As a UNICEF Ambassador, Styler has also raised millions for their projects around the globe.

In 2008, it was reported that Styler donated £10,000 into the charitable Ama Sumani cancer fund. Sumani was terminally ill with cancer and unable to afford treatment in her native Ghana, but had been deported from a Cardiff hospital after the expiry of her visa. Sumani died on 19 March 2008.

Styler is also a patron of the Elton John AIDS Foundation.

Personal life
Styler married rock musician Sting at Camden Registry Office on 20 August 1992, and the couple had their wedding blessed two days later in the twelfth-century parish church of St Andrew in Great Durnford, Wiltshire, south-west England. In 1982, Sting separated from his first wife, actress Frances Tomelty, following an affair with Styler; Tomelty and Sting divorced in 1984. The split was controversial; as The Independent reported in 2006, Tomelty "just happened to be Trudie's best friend (Sting and Frances lived next door to Trudie in Bayswater, west London, for several years before the two of them became lovers)".

Sting and Styler have four children including Brigitte Michael ("Mickey", born 19 January 1984), Jake (24 May 1985), Eliot Paulina (nicknamed "Coco", 30 July 1990), and Giacomo Luke (17 December 1995). Coco is a singer who now goes by the name Eliot Sumner, and was the founder and lead singer of the group I Blame Coco. Giacomo Luke is the inspiration behind the name of Kentucky Derby–winning horse Giacomo.

Filmography

Producer
 Boys from Brazil (1993)
 Moving the Mountain (1994)
 The Grotesque (1995) a.k.a. Gentlemen Don't Eat Poets (USA) a.k.a. Grave Indiscretion
 Lock, Stock and Two Smoking Barrels (1998: executive producer) a.k.a. Two Smoking Barrels (USA)
 Snatch (2000: executive producer)
 Greenfingers (2000) a.k.a. Jailbuds
 The Sweatbox (2002) and also directed
 Cheeky (2003)
 A Guide to Recognizing Your Saints (2006)
 Alpha Male (2006)
 Moon (2009)
 The Son of No One (2011: executive producer) 
 Girl Most Likely (2012)
 Filth (2013)
 Black Nativity (2013: executive producer) 
 Still Alice (2014: executive producer) 
 10,000 Saints (2015)
 Miss You Already (2015: executive producer) 
 American Honey (2016: executive producer) 
 For Grace (2016: executive producer) 
 Anatomy of Violence (2016: executive producer) 
 Novitiate (2017)
 Freak Show (2017)
 Kings (2017)
 The Kindergarten Teacher (2018)
 Wildling (2018)
 Boarding School (2018)
 Skin (2018)
 Driveways (2019)
 Human Capital (2019)
 With/In: Volume 1 (2021)
 With/In: Volume 2 (2021)
 Silent Night (2021)
 A Mouthful of Air (2021)
 Infinite Storm (2022)

Actress (selected) 
Poldark (1977)
The Mayor of Casterbridge (1978)
 Funny Man (1981)
 The Bell (1982)
 Cockles (1984)
Miss Marple (1984: The Body in the Library) as Josephine Turner
The American Bride (1986)
Fair Game (1988)
The Scold's Bridle (1998)
Midsomer Murders (1999 episode: "Strangler's Wood")
Me Without You (2002)
Friends (2001 season 8, episode 10: "The One with Monica's Boots") as herself (guest star)
Empire (2005)
Love Soup (2005)
Alpha Male (2006)
The Vicar of Dibley (2007 Comic Relief special: "Wife Swap")
Living Proof (2008)
Paris Connections (2010)
A Dish of Tea with Dr. Johnson (West End, Edinburgh, tour 2011)
Pose (2019)
With/In: Volume 2 (2021)

Director
 The Sweatbox (co-directed with John-Paul Davidson) (unreleased)
 Freak Show (2016)

References

External links

 

1954 births
Alumni of Bristol Old Vic Theatre School
English women activists
English television actresses
Living people
People from Bromsgrove
Sting (musician)
20th-century English actresses
21st-century English actresses
English film actresses
Actresses from Worcestershire
HIV/AIDS activists
English women film directors
Sumner musical family